Standing Tall is a 2015 French drama film directed by Emmanuelle Bercot. It was selected to open the 2015 Cannes Film Festival. The film received eight nominations at the 41st César Awards and won two, Best Supporting Actor for Benoît Magimel and Most Promising Actor for Rod Paradot.

Cast

 Catherine Deneuve as judge Florence Blaque
 Rod Paradot as Malony
 Enzo Trouillet as Malony (6-year-old)
 Benoît Magimel as Yann 
 Sara Forestier as Séverine
 Diane Rouxel as Tess
 Catherine Salée as Gladys Vatier
 Élizabeth Mazev as Claudine
 Anne Suarez as JDC director
 Christophe Meynet as Mr. Robin
 Lise Lamétrie as The first clerk
 Martin Loizillon as The public prosecutor
 Michel Masiero as The grandfather

Accolades
Principal Photography began 21 July 2014 and concluded on 17 September 2014

References

External links
 
 

2015 films
2010s coming-of-age drama films
2010s French-language films
Films directed by Emmanuelle Bercot
French coming-of-age drama films
Films featuring a Best Supporting Actor César Award-winning performance
Films set in France
Films set in 2003
Films set in 2013
Films set in 2014
2015 drama films
2010s French films
Films shot in Auvergne-Rhône-Alpes
Films shot in Hauts-de-France